"Strut" is a song recorded by Scottish singer Sheena Easton for her album A Private Heaven (1984). It was composed by singer-songwriter Charlie Dore and her longtime songwriting partner, Julian Littman. Easton was sent the demo for the song by Christopher Neil, who was Easton's first producer. "Strut" was released by EMI America in August 1984 as the album's lead single and peaked that November at  7 on the US Billboard Hot 100. In the UK—where the single was released in November 1984—the track became the first US top-40 single by Easton to completely miss the top 100 of the UK Singles Chart.

Background
While Easton had achieved success with singles over her career, The Philadelphia Inquirer asserted in 1984 that "the old Sheena Easton was running into some identity problems" due to her management not knowing whether to promote her as a rock or pop artist. EMI record executive Dick Williams noted Easton's concerns with being branded as a middle of the road artist, stating, "I think she felt, as did a lot of programmers, that her image was predominantly 'pop adult' and that limited her exposure to radio and television."

After seeing the success of top 10 dance-pop single "Telefone (Long Distance Love Affair)", Easton wanted to keep exploring that genre and move away from her image as a ballad singer. She recalled in a 1984 interview that both she and producer Greg Mathieson "wanted to keep it young, spiky and aggressive" for A Private Heaven, stating that Mathieson "fought in my corner to get me songs that normally wouldn't be sent to me, songs with a more adult lyric but a younger feel." Finding such material proved difficult; Easton noted that songs with a harder edge would be first offered to artists like Pat Benatar. She eventually found a suitable single in "Strut", however, after being sent a demo of the song by her friend and former producer, Christopher Neil. Neil encouraged her to take the song to Mathieson, who liked it enough to produce the track.

Music and lyrics 
The song appears to be about the singer being upset with a man for wanting her to be like a previous lover, and about the sexism of men in general for wanting or expecting women to behave in a certain fashion ("Strut, pout/Put it out/That's what you want from women").

Reception and accolades 
It was nominated for Best Pop Vocal Performance, Female at the 27th Grammy Awards. Like its parent album overall, the "Strut" single and accompanying video signaled Easton's shift towards a more sexually suggestive image.

Charts

Weekly charts

Year-end charts

Certifications

Popular culture
In 1986 Easton, dressed as a geisha, performed "Strut" in a Japanese TV commercial for shōchū.

References

External links
 Strut at YouTube.com

1984 singles
1984 songs
EMI America Records singles
Sheena Easton songs
Songs written by Charlie Dore